The Portland Wave, originally known as the Portland Mountain Cats, was a professional basketball team in the United States Basketball League (USBL) from 1996 to 1997. The team was based in Portland, Maine and played home games at Cumberland County Civic Center. Jeff O'Sullivan, Guy Nadeau and Ted Goldsmith were the team's board of directors. In 1996, Mark McClure served as the team's president. He was replaced in 1997 by Bill Beyer, who also took ownership of the team. In 1997, Rick Simonds served as the Wave's head coach and Jim Graffam was the assistant coach.

References

External links
Portland Mountain Cats via Maine Sports Blog
Portland Wave via Maine Sports Blog

1996 establishments in Maine
1997 disestablishments in Maine
Basketball teams established in 1996
Sports clubs disestablished in 1997
Defunct basketball teams in Maine
United States Basketball League teams
Sports in Portland, Maine
20th century in Portland, Maine